Governor Butler may refer to:

Benjamin Butler (1818–1893), 33rd Governor of Massachusetts
David Butler (politician) (1829–1891), 1st Governor of Nebraska
Ezra Butler (1763–1838), 11th Governor of Vermont
Harcourt Butler (1869–1938), Governor of Burma from 1923 to 1927
Montagu Sherard Dawes Butler (1873–1955), Governor of the Central Provinces from 1925 to 1933
Nathaniel Butler (born 1578), Governor of Bermuda from 1619 to 1622 and Governor of Providence Island from 1638 to 1640
Pierce Mason Butler (1798–1847), 56th Governor of South Carolina
Robert Butler (U.S. commander), Acting Governor of East Florida in 1821
Thomas Butler, 6th Earl of Ossory (1634–1680),Governor of Tangier in 1680